Härad is a locality situated in Strängnäs Municipality, Södermanland County, Sweden with 508 inhabitants in 2010.

People
 Agnes Welin who founded a mission for Swedish seamen in London was born here in 1844.

References 

Populated places in Södermanland County
Populated places in Strängnäs Municipality